John Henry Cates (July 13, 1896 – October 26, 1986) was a businessman and political figure in British Columbia. He represented North Vancouver in the Legislative Assembly of British Columbia from 1945 to 1952 as a Liberal.

He was born in Moodyville, the son of Charles Henry Cates. Cates was a partner in the tugboat company C.H. Cates and Sons. He served in the Royal Navy during World War I. Cates was a member of a Liberal-Conservative coalition in the assembly and served as Minister of Labour in the provincial cabinet. In 1927, he married Carrie Matilda Sweeten, who later served as mayor of North Vancouver; she died in 1977. Cates died at the age of 90 in 1986.

References 

1896 births
1986 deaths
British Columbia Liberal Party MLAs